Fuego en la sangre may refer to:

 Fuego en la sangre (1966 film), a 1966 Argentine film
 Fuego en la sangre (telenovela), a 2008 Mexican telenovela
 Fire in the Blood (1953 film) (Fuego en la sangre), a 1953 Spanish drama film